Caprice is a 1913 silent film produced by Daniel Frohman and Adolph Zukor released by Famous Players Film Company and starring Mary Pickford. J. Searle Dawley directed. Though Zukor helped finance the film it was distributed on a 'State's Rights' arrangement primarily since no Paramount Pictures had yet to exist. The story of this film had been acted on the stage by a young Minnie Maddern Fiske in the 1880s, one of her earliest successes as an adult actress. The same story gives Pickford the chance to arise to the height of a fine actress instead of just merely a popular performer. This film is lost.

Cast
Mary Pickford - Mercy Baxter
Owen Moore - Jack Henderson
Ernest Truex - Wally Henderson
Ogden Crane - Jim Baxter
James Gordon - Mr. Henderson
Boots Wall - Edith Henderson

unbilled
Louise Huff
Howard Missimer
John Steppling

See also
List of Paramount Pictures films

References

External links
 
 
 Caprice entry in the AFI Catalog of Feature Films
 lobby card
 lantern slide
 advertisement

1913 films
American silent feature films
American films based on plays
Films directed by J. Searle Dawley
Lost American films
1910s English-language films
1913 comedy-drama films
American black-and-white films
Paramount Pictures films
1913 lost films
Lost comedy-drama films
1913 comedy films
1913 drama films
1910s American films
Silent American comedy-drama films